Mount Vernon is a city in Knox County, Ohio, United States. The population was 16,990 at the 2010 census. It is the county seat of Knox County.

History
The community was platted in 1805, and named after Mount Vernon, the estate owned by George Washington.

In May 1953, the telephone exchange for the entire city was destroyed by fire, disrupting calls for months.

In January 1959, a severe flood caused 500 homes to be evacuated and caused $5 million in damage.

In October of 2021, a board of clergy and activists unanimously voted to start a chapter of PFLAG in Mount Vernon. PFLAG will be the second LGBTQ+ organization formed in Knox County.

Historic sites
The Woodward Opera House, the oldest opera theater of its kind in the United States, is located downtown. The theater, after many years of renovation and restoration, has been transformed into a local cultural and performing-arts center.

The Knox County Historical Society, with a building and extensive exhibits, makes its headquarters on Harcourt Road in Mount Vernon. Exhibits feature information about Daniel Decatur Emmett, Paul Lynde, The Cooper Company and other subjects.

Geography

Mount Vernon is located at  (40.392738, −82.481151).

The city lies in the Glaciated Allegheny Plateau and is surrounded by rolling hills and valleys.

The Kokosing River and U.S. Route 36 pass through the city.

Demographics

2010 census
As of the census of 2010, there were 16,990 people, 7,110 households, and 4,016 families living in the city. The racial makeup of the city was 95.3% White, 1.1% African American, 0.2% Native American, 1.1% Asian, 0.7% from other races, and 1.5% from two or more races. Hispanic or Latino of any race were 1.8% of the population.

There were 7,110 households, of which 28.3% had children under the age of 18 living with them, 38.4% were married couples living together, 13.6% had a female householder with no husband present, 4.4% had a male householder with no wife present, and 43.5% were non-families. 38.0% of all households were made up of individuals, and 16.5% had someone living alone who was 65 years of age or older. The average household size was 2.19 and the average family size was 2.88.

The median age in the city was 37.2 years. 21.8% of residents were under the age of 18; 13.7% were between the ages of 18 and 24; 23.2% were from 25 to 44; 24% were from 45 to 64; and 17.3% were 65 years of age or older. The gender makeup of the city was 46.5% male and 53.5% female.

2000 census
As of the census of 2000, there were 15,256 people, 6,187 households, and 3,730 families living in the city. The population density was 1,710.4 people per square mile (660.7/km2). There were 6,713 housing units at an average density of 798.7 per square mile (308.6/km2). The "racial" makeup of the city was 96.66% White, 1.15% African American, 0.31% Native American, 0.54% Asian, 0.29% from other races, and 1.04% from two or more "races". Hispanic or Latino of any "race" were 0.87% of the population.

There were 6,187 households, out of which 28.0% had children under the age of 18 living with them, 43.8% were married couples living together, 12.7% had a female householder with no husband present, and 39.7% were non-families. 34.2% of all households were made up of individuals, and 16.1% had someone living alone who was 65 years of age or older. The average household size was 2.25 and the average family size was 2.88.

In the city the population was spread out, with 23.7% under the age of 18, 10.1% from 18 to 24, 27.2% from 25 to 44, 20.7% from 45 to 64, and 18.3% who were 65 years of age or older. The median age was 37 years. For every 100 females, there were 86.2 males. For every 100 females age 18 and over, there were 81.3 males.

The median income for a household in the city was $29,801, and the median income for a family was $38,217. Males had a median income of $31,900 versus $21,969 for females. The per capita income for the city was $16,471. About 12.7% of families and 15.6% of the population were below the poverty line, including 20.7% of those under age 18 and 9.2% of those age 65 or over.

Economy
Mount Vernon was the birthplace of Cooper Industries. There is a large industrial complex in the western part of the city that manufactures and repairs products for the gas and oil power generation industries. It was acquired by Rolls-Royce North America, and in 2014 Siemens bought the Mount Vernon plant. Facing a declining market, Siemens announced major reductions in employment in October 2016 and in 2018 announced their Mount Vernon facility would close by 2019.

Ariel Corporation, a major manufacturer of reciprocating natural gas (and other gasses) compressors, is also located in Mount Vernon. Its history is tied to that of Cooper Industries in that Jim Buchwald, one of the founders of Ariel, was a former engineer for Cooper Industries Mount Vernon.

Two universities in Mount Vernon and nearby Gambier, Ohio provide hundreds of jobs to the local residents. Mount Vernon is home to Mount Vernon Nazarene University and Gambier is home to Kenyon College.

Education

Colleges and universities
 Kenyon College (located in nearby Gambier)
 Mount Vernon Nazarene University
 Central Ohio Technical College

High schools
 Mount Vernon High School (Ohio)
 Knox County Career Center

Notable people
 Johnny Appleseed (John Chapman), pioneer and folkloric figure
 Eldad Cicero Camp, coal tycoon
 Fred Dailey, State of Ohio Agriculture Director and US Congressional candidate
 Hiram and Barney Davis, two dwarf brothers and side-show performers
 Columbus Delano, Whig and Republican politician and lawyer
 Daniel Decatur Emmett, composer of "Dixie", Early Blackface performer
 Lansford Hastings, California pioneer
 Rob Kelly, NFL football player
 Paul Lynde, comedian and actor
 Chris McLernon, musician and actor
 Juan Manuel García Passalacqua, Puerto Rican politician and television personality
 Ralph W. Sockman, clergyman, author, and radio speaker
 Jim Stillwagon, American football player
 Jesse B. Thomas, first senator of Illinois and proposer of the Missouri Compromise
 Ellamae Simmons, first African American woman to specialize in asthma, allergy, and immunology in the United States. Integrated the United States Army Nurse Corps and the dorms at the Ohio State University

References

External links

 City website
 Mount Vernon News, a newspaper based in Mt. Vernon
 Knox Pages

Populated places established in 1805
County seats in Ohio
Cities in Knox County, Ohio
1805 establishments in Ohio
Cities in Ohio